Sanga Kanchanakphan (7 July 1897 – 2 July 1980), also known by the noble title Khun Wichitmatra, wrote the lyrics of the Thai National Anthem which was played for the first time in July, 1932.  The lyrics were subsequently rewritten two years later by Chan Kamwilai.

Thai composers
1897 births
1980 deaths
Khun (nobility)